The communes of Ivory Coast are a fifth-level administrative unit of administration in Ivory Coast. The sub-prefectures of Ivory Coast contain villages, and in select instances more than one village is combined into a commune. There are currently 197 communes in the 510 sub-prefectures.

Prior to 2011, communes were the third-level administrative units of the country. Under the administration of Laurent Gbagbo, the number of communes grew to more than 1300. In 2011, a reorganization of the country's subdivisions was undertaken, with a goal of decentralizing the state. As part of the reorganization, communes were converted from third-level divisions into fifth-level divisions.

In March 2012, the government abolished 1126 communes on the grounds that under the new jurisdiction of districts, regions, departments, and sub-prefectures, these particular communes were not economically viable governmental units. As a result of the reorganisation, there are now 197 communes in Ivory Coast. In many parts of the country, responsibilities previously carried out by the communes have been transferred to other levels of government. In most cases, the town that is the seat of the commune is also the seat of a sub-prefecture.

Communes A–Z

Communes by district and region

Autonomous District of Abidjan

Bas-Sassandra District

Comoé District

Denguélé District

Gôh-Djiboua District

Lacs District

Lagunes District

Montagnes District

Sassandra-Marahoué District

Savanes District

Vallée du Bandama District

Woroba District

Autonomous District of Yamoussoukro
Yamoussoukro

Zanzan District

Laws creating communes 
The following laws and decrees created communes in Ivory Coast. Many of the communes created by these laws were abolished in the decree of March 2012.

  Loi n° 78-07 du 9 janvier 1978 portant institution de communes de plein exercice en Côte d'Ivoire
  Loi n° 80-1180 du 17 Octobre 1980 relative a l'organisation municipale modifée par les Lois N°s 85-578 du 29 juillet 1985 et 95-608 ainsi que 95-611 du 03 août 1995
  Loi n° 85-1085 du 17 octobre 1985 portant création de quatre-vingt-dix-huit (98) communes de plein exercice en Côte d'Ivoire
  Décret n° 80-1078 du 19 septembre 1980, fixant le ressort territorial des communes de Côte d'Ivoire
  Décret n° 85-1114 du 8 novembre 1985, fixant le ressort territorial de quatre-vingt-dix-huit (98) communes et portant modification des limites territoriales d'une commune
  Décret n° 90-1594 du 12 décembre 1990 portant modification du décret n° 80-1078 du 19 septembre 1980 fixant le ressort territorial des communes de Côte d'Ivoire et du décret n° 85-1114 du 8 novembre 1985 fixant le ressort de quatre-vingt-dix-huit communes et portant modification des limites territoriales d'une commune
  Décret n° 95-529 du 14 juillet 1995, portant modification du décret n° 80-1078 due 19 septembre 1980 fixant le ressort territorial des communes de Côte d'Ivoire et du décret n° 85-1114 du 8 novembre 1985, fixant le ressort territorial de quatre-vingt-dix-huit (98) communes et portant modification des limites territoriales d'une commune
  Décret n° 95-941 du 13 décembre 1995, portant création de nouvelles communes
  Décret n° 95-942 du 13 décembre 1995, fixant le ressort territorial des nouvelles communes
  Décret n° 95-945 du 13 décembre, modifiant et complétant le décret n° 80-1078 du 19 septembre 1980 fixant le ressort territorial des communes de Côte d'Ivoire, le décret n° 85-1114 du 8 novembre 1985, fixant le ressort territorial de quatre-vingt-dix-huit (98) communes et portant modification des limites territoriales d'une commune et le décret n° 95-529 du 14 juillet 1995, portant modification des décrets susvisés
  Décret n° 98-157 du 02 avril 1998 portant création de la commune de Mayo
  Décret n° 2005-314 du 6 octobre 2005, portant création de cinq cent vingt (520) communes
  Décret n° 2008-115 du 6 mars 2008, modifiant et complétant le décret n° 2005-314 du 6 octobre 2005 portant création de cinq cent vingt (520) communes

Notes

External links
collectivitesdecentralisees.gouv.ci

 
Subdivisions of Ivory Coast
Ivory Coast
1978 establishments in Ivory Coast
States and territories established in 1978
Ivory Coast 5